This is a list of rivers that are at least partially in Greece. The rivers flowing into the sea are sorted along the coast. Rivers flowing into other rivers are listed by the rivers they flow into.  The confluence is given in parentheses.

For an alphabetical overview of rivers of Greece see :Category:Rivers of Greece.

Tributaries

Adriatic Sea

 Aoos/Vjosë (near Novoselë, Albania)
 Drino (in Tepelenë, Albania)
 Sarantaporos (near Çarshovë, Albania)
 Voidomatis (near Konitsa)

Ionian Sea
Rivers in this section are sorted north (Albanian border) to south (Cape Malea).

Epirus & Central Greece
Pavla/Pavllë (near Vrinë, Albania)
Thyamis (near Igoumenitsa)
Tyria (near Vrosina)
Acheron (near Parga)
Louros (near Preveza)
Arachthos (in Kommeno)
Acheloos (near Astakos)
Megdovas (near Fragkista)
Agrafiotis (near Fragkista)
Granitsiotis (near Granitsa)
Evinos (near Missolonghi)
Mornos (near Nafpaktos)
 Pleistos, near Kirra

Peloponnese

Elissonas (in Dimini)
Fonissa (near Xylokastro)
Zacholitikos (in Derveni)
Krios (in Aigeira)
Krathis (near Akrata)
Vouraikos (near Diakopto)
Selinountas (near Aigio)
Volinaios (in Psathopyrgos)
Charadros (in Patras)
Glafkos (in Patras)
Peiros (in Dymi)
Tytheus (in Olenia)
Larissos (near Araxos)
Pineios (near Gastouni)
Alfeios (near Pyrgos)
Erymanthos (near Tripotamia)
Ladon (near Tripotamia)
Aroanios (near Filia)
Lousios (near Gortyna)
Elissonas (near Megalopoli)
Neda (near Giannitsochori)
Peristeri (in Kalo Nero)
Pamisos (near Messene)
Nedonas (in Kalamata)
Eurotas (in Elos)
Oenus (in Sparti)

Aegean Sea
Rivers in this section are sorted south (Cape Malea) to northeast (Turkish border).

Peloponnese
Inachos (in Nea Kios)

Central Greece
Cephissus (in Athens)
Eridanos
 Ilisos, Athens
Asopos (in Skala Oropou)
Spercheios (near Lamia)
Gorgopotamos (near Lamia)

Thessaly
Pineios (in Stomio)
Titarisios (in Ampelonas)
Sarantaporos (in Milea)
Enipeas (in Farkadona)
 Portaikos, Trikala
Anavros, Volos
Krausidonas, Volos

Macedonia
Haliacmon (in Methoni)
 Loudias
Axios/Vardar (near Thessaloniki)
Gallikos (near Thessaloniki)
Strymonas/Struma (in Amphipolis)
Angitis (near Tragilos)
Nestos/Mesta (near Keramoti)
Despatis/Dospat (near Sidironero)

Thrace
Evros/Maritsa (near Alexandroupoli)
Erythropotamos/Luda reka (near Didymoteicho)
Ardas/Arda (near Edirne, Turkey)
 Vosvozis, Lake Ismarida
 Kompsatos, Lake Vistonida
 Kosynthos, Lake Vistonida

Libyan Sea
Anapodaris, Crete

No outflow into sea
Cephissus into lake Yliki, Boeotia
Kanianitis (in Lilaia)
Olvios into the Feneos plains, Corinthia

Ancient rivers and streams

Ammites  (stream; emptied into Lake Bolbe)
Bisaltes 
Elpeus
Erasinos (emptied into the modern Petalies Gulf)
Erechios  (stream; emptied into the Strymonic Gulf)
Olynthiakos (stream; emptied into Lake Bolbe)
Rhoedias (emptied into the Thermaic Gulf)

Greece
Rivers